Daiva Jodeikaitė (born 1 April 1966) is a former Soviet and Lithuanian female professional basketball player.

References

1966 births
Living people
Lithuanian women's basketball players
People from Rokiškis
Small forwards
Soviet women's basketball players